is a Japanese footballer who plays for Verspah Oita.

Club statistics
Updated to 1 January 2020.

References

External links

Profile at Kataller Toyama

1993 births
Living people
Hosei University alumni
Association football people from Yamanashi Prefecture
Japanese footballers
J3 League players
Japan Football League players
Kataller Toyama players
Verspah Oita players
ReinMeer Aomori players
Association football midfielders